Dr. Žak Konfino (Leskovac 1892 Belgrad 1975 ), physician and writer, published a dozen books and short stories. He studied medicine first in Vienna (1910–1914) and finished in Bern (1916–1918).

His ancestors were expelled from Spain in the fifteenth century and lived as Sephardic Jews in Istanbul and Thessaloniki. In the late 18th and early 19th century they settled in Leskovac. During World War II, he served as a medical assistant in Valjevo and Leskovac and ended up with the Serbian army in Albania. In his home town of Leskovac he spent from 1920-1936 as a doctor and then moved to Belgrade, where he opened a private practice as a specialist in the treatment of asthma and radiology. Konfin got the first X-ray machine in 1924 in Leskovac. World War II he spent in captivity in Italy. After World War II he returned to Belgrade and worked in Major military hospital.

Konfino wrote stories, humorous, travel, and published them first in "Leskovac Journal" and then the "Jewish life" "the South", "Politics", " Serbian literary Gazette , ""NIN", the "Medical Gazette", "Hedgehog" and others. Books have been translated into Albanian, Czech, English, Hungarian, German, Polish, Portuguese, Slovak, Turkish ... and he translated from German and Italian, and understands French and Portuguese.

Žak Konfino first appears in literature only in his forties, and humorous stories.

Sources 

1.http://www.jevrejski-glas.freeservers.com/10-feb/Galerija.html

Serbian radiologists
1892 births
1975 deaths
Serbian Sephardi Jews
Serbian writers
20th-century Serbian people
Yugoslav writers
Yugoslav physicians
20th-century Sephardi Jews